Cofilin 1 (non-muscle; n-cofilin), also known as CFL1, is a human gene, part of the ADF/cofilin family.

Cofilin is a widely distributed intracellular actin-modulating protein that binds and depolymerizes filamentous F-actin and inhibits the polymerization of monomeric G-actin in a pH-dependent manner. It is involved in the translocation of actin-cofilin complex from cytoplasm to nucleus.

One group reports that reelin signaling leads to serine3-phosphorylation of cofilin-1, and this interaction may play a role in the reelin-related regulation of neuronal migration.

Interactions 

Cofilin 1 has been shown to interact with HSPH1 and LIMK1.

References

Further reading